The 26th Annual D.I.C.E. Awards was an edition of the D.I.C.E. Awards ("Design Innovate Communicate Entertain"), an annual awards event that honors the best games in the video game industry during 2022. The awards were arranged by the Academy of Interactive Arts & Sciences (AIAS). The nominees were announced on January 12, 2023.

As with God of War (2018), God of War Ragnarök led the ceremony with 12 nominations and had won the most wins with seven, while Elden Ring was awarded Game of the Year. Tim Schafer, co-founder of Double Fine Productions and known for the games Grim Fandango, Psychonauts, and Broken Age, received the academy's Hall of Fame Award.

Winners and Nominees
Nominees were announced on January 12, 2023.

Special Awards
Hall of Fame
 Tim Schafer

Multiple nominations and awards

Multiple nominations

Multiple awards

References

2022 video game awards
2022 awards in the United States
February 2022 events in the United States
2022 in video gaming
D.I.C.E. Award ceremonies